Friedrich Aue (27 July 1896 – 27 November 1944) was a German resistance fighter against the regime of Nazi Germany.

Aue was a locksmith from Dodendorf (a part of Sülzetal), Prussian Saxony. In 1925 he joined the Communist Party of Germany (KPD). After Adolf Hitler seized power in 1933, Aue became involved in the resistance to Nazi rule. In February 1944, he was arrested by the Gestapo. Aue was sentenced to death on 25 October 1944. The sentence was carried out at the labour prison Zuchthaus Brandenburg in Brandenburg an der Havel.

The city of Magdeburg has named a street, Friedrich-Aue-Straße, in his honour.

References
 Ingelore Buchholz, Was Magdeburger Straßennamen erzählen, c.1983, Hrsg. SED-Stadtleitung Magdeburg.

1896 births
1944 deaths
People from Börde (district)

Executed communists in the German Resistance
German resistance members
German communists
People from the Province of Saxony
People who died in Brandenberg concentration camp
Resistance members who died in Nazi concentration camps
German civilians killed in World War II
People from Saxony-Anhalt executed in Nazi concentration camps